Okhansky (masculine), Okhanskaya (feminine), or Okhanskoye (neuter) may refer to:
Okhansky District, a district of Perm Krai, Russia
Okhansky Uyezd (1781–1923), an administrative division of the Russian Empire and the early RSFSR
Okhanskoye Urban Settlement, a municipal formation which the town of Okhansk in Okhansky District of Perm Krai, Russia is incorporated as